This is a list of breweries in South Carolina, a U.S. state. Some of these microbreweries also operate brewpubs, serving food as well as beer. On June 2, 2014, Governor Nikki Haley signed the "Stone Bill" which allowed production breweries to serve food, and eradicated consumption restrictions which previously limited patrons to 48 ounces per customer.
As of 2019, there are 46 breweries operating across the state. Palmetto Brewery is the oldest and largest in the state.

See also 
 Beer in the United States
 List of breweries in the United States
 List of microbreweries

References

South Carolina
Breweries